Robert Jarosław Iwaszkiewicz (born 17 May 1962) is a Polish politician of the KORWiN who was elected in May 2014 as a Member of the European Parliament (MEP).

Biography 
Originally a non-inscrit in the EP, he joined the Europe of Freedom and Direct Democracy (EFDD) on 20 October 2014. The EFDD had briefly ceased to exist when Iveta Grigule left the group since it no longer had representatives from seven countries as the EP rules require. Upon Iwaszkiewicz joining, group leader Nigel Farage stated "To paraphrase Mark Twain 'Rumours of our death have been greatly exaggerated.'" as the group again had members from the required seven countries. The three other members of KNP remained non-inscrits. Iwaszkiewicz cited UKIP's support for free market economy and fight against EU bureaucracy as reasons for joining the group.

He is a former member of the UPR and KNP. In 2015 he was co-founder of paleolibertarian party KORWiN.

He is a member of the European Parliament Committee on the Internal Market and Consumer Protection. 
Member of the Organization of Polish Monarchists.

He is an individual member of the Extreme-Right European political party Alliance of European National Movements.

References 

1962 births
Living people
Congress of the New Right politicians
MEPs for Poland 2014–2019
Polish monarchists
Non-Inscrits MEPs
Europe of Freedom and Direct Democracy MEPs
Politicians from Wrocław